was a town located in Yamagata District, Hiroshima Prefecture, Japan.

As of 2003, the town had an estimated population of 3,711 and a density of 41.01 persons per km2. The total area was 90.50 km2.

On February 1, 2005, Ōasa, along with the towns of Chiyoda, Geihoku and Toyohira (all from Yamagata District), was merged to create the town of Kitahiroshima.

External links
 Official website of Kitahiroshima in Japanese

Dissolved municipalities of Hiroshima Prefecture